Guna de Wargandí or Wargandí, formerly known as Kuna de Wargandí is a comarca indígena (indigenous territory) and corregimiento  in Pinogana District, Darién Province, Panama with a population of 1,914 as of 2010. It was created by Law 34 of July 25, 2000,  from the province of Darién, from the district of Pinogana. It is inhabited by the Guna people.

Geography
It is a region of Guna and its status is local township, so this has no political subdivision or capital. It is located in the basin are high Chucunaque River in the territory segregated districts Pinogana Chepigana and the province of Darien. People live in three communities, Mortí, Nurra and Wala.

This comarca is not divided into districts. The community of Nurra serves as its capital.

References

 
Comarcas of Panama
States and territories established in 2000
2000 establishments in Panama
Corregimientos of Darién Province